Michael Pfleghar (20 March 1933 – 23 June 1991) was a German film director and screenwriter. He directed 17 films between 1958 and 1987. He died of suicide.

Selected filmography
 Dead Woman from Beverly Hills (1964)
 Serenade for Two Spies (1965)
 How to Seduce a Playboy (1966)
 The Oldest Profession (1967, anthology film)
 Visions of Eight (1973, anthology film)
  (1973–1979, TV series)
 Zwei himmlische Töchter (1978, TV series)
 Die lieben Verwandten (1991, TV series)

References

External links
 

1933 births
1991 suicides
Mass media people from Stuttgart
20th-century German male writers
Suicides by firearm in Germany